Hitler: The Rise of Evil is a Canadian television miniseries in two parts, directed by Christian Duguay and produced by Alliance Atlantis. It stars Robert Carlyle in the lead role and explores Adolf Hitler's rise and his early consolidation of power during the years after the First World War and focuses on how the embittered, politically fragmented and economically buffeted state of German society following the war made that ascent possible. The film also focuses on Ernst Hanfstaengl's influence on Hitler's rise to power. The miniseries, which premiered simultaneously in May 2003 on CBC in Canada and CBS in the United States, received two Emmy Awards, for Art Direction and Sound Editing, while Peter O'Toole was nominated for Best Supporting Actor.

The film's subplot follows the struggles of Fritz Gerlich, a German journalist who opposes the rising Nazi Party. The quotation disputably attributed to Edmund Burke is displayed at the beginning and end of the film:

"The only thing necessary for the triumph of evil is for good men to do nothing."

Plot
The opening is a montage of Hitler's life from 1899 to 1914, when he left Austria for Munich. His participation in the First World War on the German side is then shown in a series of episodes that includes his promotion to the rank of corporal, his awarding of the Iron Cross for bravery, and his blinding during a gas attack.

Hitler returns to a revolutionary Munich in 1919 and, still employed by the army, is assigned to report on the newly-formed political parties in the city. After attending a meeting of the German Workers' Party, he is recruited by the party's leader, Anton Drexler, to organize its propaganda activities and give increasingly-popular speeches that harp on the themes that Germany has been betrayed by the leaders who surrendered in the last war and that Communists and Jews are sapping the German spirit from within. After meeting the wealthy art publisher Ernst Hanfstaengl, Hitler is encouraged to refine his image and create a symbol for the party, which he does by adopting the swastika. Hanfstaengl also puts Hitler in contact with the city's influential figures, including the war hero Hermann Göring, and the militant Ernst Röhm, eventual organizer of the paramilitary SA. In 1921, Hitler forces Drexler to resign and takes over as leader of the renamed National Socialist Party.

In 1923, the Minister of Bavaria, Gustav von Kahr, urged on by his speechwriter, the journalist Fritz Gerlich, tries to outfox Hitler by convincing him that he is preparing to stage a military coup against the national government in Berlin and that Hitler must remain silent, or his party can play no part in it. Upon learning that the proposed putsch is merely a ruse, Hitler confronts Kahr at gunpoint and coerces him and his associates into supporting his own plan for a putsch. Röhm and the SA plan to take over the military barracks in preparation for a march on Berlin, but the attempted coup is quickly crushed. Hitler takes refuge at the Hanfstaengl home, almost resorting to suicide before Ernst's wife takes the gun from his hand.

Arrested by the authorities and tried for treason, Hitler manages to use the trial to his advantage, winning over the audience and the judge with his courtroom theatrics. Consequently, he is awarded a lenient sentence in Landsberg Prison, where he writes his memoirs (later published as Mein Kampf). In 1925, Hitler goes to the countryside to escape from politics and is joined by his older half-sister, Angela, and her daughter, Geli Raubal. When he returns to Munich, Hitler takes Geli with him but, distraught by his overbearing control of her life, she commits suicide.

Eschewing revolution, Hitler now demands that the party follow a democratic course to power. That declaration puts him into conflict with Röhm, but Hitler's demand for complete subordination of the party to himself as Führer (Leader) wins the approval of most others, including an impressionable young agitator named Joseph Goebbels. During the late 1920s, the party's political fortunes improve, with the National Socialists gaining more and more seats in the Reichstag with each election. Alarmed by the party's growing popularity, Gerlich continues to write articles in opposition to Hitler and, when the paper's editor fires him, forms his own newspaper.

In 1932, Hitler becomes a German citizen and runs for president against the incumbent, Paul von Hindenburg. Although he is unsuccessful, the party has become the largest in the Reichstag, which emboldens Hitler to demand that he be made Chancellor of Germany. Though Hindenburg despises Hitler, the former Chancellor Franz von Papen helps bring that about in 1933. Later, the Reichstag building is set on fire, allegedly by a communist, and Hitler uses the incident to have parliament award him dictatorial powers, which include suspension of civil liberties and suppression of the press. As a consequence, Gerlich's newspaper is shut down and he is arrested by the SA and sent to a concentration camp.

Germany now becomes a police state, and Hitler crushes all his opponents, both inside and outside the party, which sees Röhm being shot and the SA greatly reduced. Röhm is later sentenced to death, and the rest of the SA is absorbed into the Reichswehr army. After Hindenburg's death in August 1934, Hitler combines the office of president and chancellor into one, finally making him the ultimate ruler of Germany.

Cast

 Robert Carlyle as Adolf Hitler
 Stockard Channing as Klara Hitler
 Jena Malone as Geli Raubal
 Julianna Margulies as Helene Hanfstaengl
 Matthew Modine as Fritz Gerlich
 Liev Schreiber as Ernst Hanfstaengl
 Peter Stormare as Ernst Röhm
 Friedrich von Thun as Erich Ludendorff
 Peter O'Toole as Paul von Hindenburg
 Zoe Telford as Eva Braun
 Terence Harvey as Gustav Ritter von Kahr
 Justin Salinger as Dr. Joseph Goebbels
 Chris Larkin as Hermann Göring
 James Babson as  Rudolf Hess
 Patricia Netzer as Sophie Gerlich
 Harvey Friedman as Friedrich Hollaender
 Nicole Marischka as Blandine Ebinger
 Julie-Ann Hassett as Angela Hitler
 Thomas Sangster as Hitler (age 10)
 Simon Sullivan as Hitler (age 17)
 Robert Glenister as Anton Drexler
 Brendan Hughes as Hugo Gutmann
 Ian Hogg as Alois Hitler

Production
Originally, Hitler biographer Ian Kershaw had been on board as a consultant in the production of Hitler: The Rise of Evil. Alliance Atlantis, which had purchased the rights to adapt Kershaw's celebrated biography had wanted to make it more dramatic, but Kershaw found the production's liberties so historically inaccurate regarding Hitler's life that he ultimately chose to have his name discarded from the project.

Executive producer Ed Gernon was fired for comparing the climate of fear that led to the rise of Hitler's Nazism to U.S. President George W. Bush's war on terrorism. CBS was prompted to act by a New York Post article that claimed Gernon's comment as an indicator of anti-Americanism in Hollywood.

Reception
The miniseries received mixed reviews but was nominated for seven Emmy Awards and won two. It received a nomination as "Outstanding Miniseries" and Peter O'Toole was nominated for an Emmy in the supporting actor in a TV movie or miniseries category. The miniseries won a Primetime Emmy Award for Art Direction and John Douglas Smith won the Emmy Award for "Outstanding Sound Editing For A Miniseries, Movie Or A Special" as Supervising Sound Editor.

The New York Times said: "The filmmakers worked so hard to be tasteful and responsible that they robbed their film of suspense, drama and passion", but commented positively on the performances of Peter O'Toole, Julianna Margulies, and Liev Schreiber.

David Wiegand of the San Francisco Chronicle gave it a positive review, praising Carlyle's performance as "brilliant".

The German magazine Der Spiegel called the film a "soap opera" and "flat melodrama with invented key scenes - Hitler for stupid people."

See also 

 Adolf Hitler in popular culture
 Beer Hall Putsch
 Concentration Camps in Nazi Germany

References

External links

 
 

Films directed by Christian Duguay (director)
Political drama films
Films set in the 1910s
Films set in the 1920s
Films set in the 1930s
Films about Adolf Hitler
Films scored by Normand Corbeil
Films shot in the Czech Republic
CBC Television original films
English-language Canadian films
Cultural depictions of Adolf Hitler
Cultural depictions of Eva Braun
Cultural depictions of Joseph Goebbels
Cultural depictions of Hermann Göring
Cultural depictions of Paul von Hindenburg
Cultural depictions of Erich Ludendorff
2003 films
Rises to prominence by individual
2000s English-language films
Canadian biographical drama films
Canadian drama television films
2000s Canadian films